Louis Cannon (born 1933) is an American journalist, non-fiction author, and biographer. He was state bureau chief for the San Jose Mercury News in the late 1960s, and later senior White House correspondent of The Washington Post during the Ronald Reagan administration. He is a prolific biographer of US President Ronald Reagan and has written five books about him.

Cannon is currently a columnist and editorial advisor to State Net Capitol Journal, a weekly publication focused on state legislation and politics. He is the father of Carl M. Cannon.

See also
 Santa Barbara News-Press controversy

References

Bibliography

Ronnie and Jesse: A Political Odyssey (New York: Doubleday, 1969) 
The McCloskey Challenge (1972)
Reporting: An Inside View (1977)
Reagan (1982)
President Reagan: The Role of a Lifetime (1991)
Official Negligence: How Rodney King and the Riots Changed Los Angeles and the LAPD (1998)
Ronald Reagan: The Presidential Portfolio: History as Told through the Collection of the Ronald Reagan Library and Museum (2001)
Governor Reagan: His Rise to Power (2003)

External links
Lou Cannon at Boeing
Lou Cannon at All American Speakers, LLC

1933 births
Living people
The Washington Post people
The Mercury News people